Assistant Secretary of the Navy (ASN) is the title given to certain civilian senior officials in the United States Department of the Navy.

From 1861 to 1954, the Assistant Secretary of the Navy was the second-highest civilian office in the Department of the Navy (reporting to the United States Secretary of the Navy).  That role has since been supplanted by the office of Under Secretary of the Navy and the office of Assistant Secretary of the Navy has been abolished.  There have, however, been a number of offices bearing the phrase "Assistant Secretary of the Navy" in their title (see below for details).

At present, there are four Assistant Secretaries of the Navy, each of whom reports to and assists the Secretary of the Navy and the Under Secretary of the Navy:

 Assistant Secretary of the Navy (Research, Development and Acquisition)
 Assistant Secretary of the Navy (Manpower and Reserve Affairs)
 Assistant Secretary of the Navy (Financial Management and Comptroller)
 Assistant Secretary of the Navy (Energy, Installations and Environment)
 The General Counsel of the Navy is equivalent in rank to the four Assistant Secretaries.

History
The Office of the Assistant Secretary of the Navy was established in 1861, to provide a senior deputy to the Secretary.  The Assistant Secretary was responsible for the Navy's civilian personnel, as well as for administration of shore facilities (such as naval bases and shipyards). Gustavus Fox was the first to hold the post, serving throughout the Civil War. The office was disestablished in 1869, during Reconstruction, but was reestablished by Congress on July 11, 1890. James R. Soley was the first to be appointed to the newly reestablished position.

The Assistant Secretary was the Navy's number-two civilian until 1940, when Congress established the position of Under Secretary of the Navy, who was given oversight of the Assistant Secretary's activities. James V. Forrestal, later Secretary of Defense, was the first to serve as Under Secretary; he held the post until 1944, when he became Secretary of the Navy.

During the 20th century, the responsibilities of the Assistant Secretary were divided among several officials. During the 1920s, for example, to reflect the increasing importance of naval aviation, Congress established the position of Assistant Secretary of the Navy for Air.

The office of Assistant Secretary of the Navy was disestablished in 1954.

Famous Assistant Secretaries of the Navy
 U.S. President Theodore Roosevelt served as Assistant Secretary of the Navy from 1897 to 1898, during the William McKinley administration.
 U.S. President Franklin D. Roosevelt served as Assistant Secretary of the Navy from 1913 until 1920, and helped to implement Navy policies during World War I.
 According to author Edward J. Renehan, Jr., no fewer than five members of the extended Roosevelt clan served as Assistant Secretary of the Navy: Theodore Roosevelt, Franklin Roosevelt, Theodore Roosevelt Jr. who served from 1921 through 1924 under Harding and Coolidge, Theodore Douglas Robinson (the son of Corinne Roosevelt) who served from 1924 through 1929 under Coolidge, and finally Henry Latrobe Roosevelt, a descendant of Robert Fulton's old friend "Steamboat Nicholas" Roosevelt, who served from 1933 through 1936 under FDR.
 Ralph Austin Bard was Assistant Secretary (1941–1944) and then Under Secretary (1944–1945) during World War II.

Assistant Secretaries of the Navy, 1861–1954

Defunct offices bearing the title of "Assistant Secretary of the Navy"

References

External links
 80.3.1 Records of the Office of the Assistant Secretary of the Navy General Records of the Department of the Navy, 1798-1947 (Record Group 80) 1804–1958, from the U.S. National Archives and Records Administration
 Naval Historical Center, Washington, D.C. Source for papers and photos of various Assistant Secretaries of the Navy
 Navy Organization – The Secretariat An organizational chart for the Office of the Secretary of the Navy, Dept. of the Navy

1861 establishments in the United States
Office of the Secretary of the Navy